Lümandu may refer to several places in Estonia:

Lümandu, Kohila Parish, village in Kohila Parish, Rapla County
Lümandu, Märjamaa Parish, village in Märjamaa Parish, Rapla County